Kelvin Glen Davis (born 2 March 1967) is a New Zealand politician and a member of the House of Representatives who has served as Deputy Leader of the Labour Party since 1 August 2017.

A former teacher, Davis served as a list MP from 2008 to 2011 and again in 2014. He won the electorate of Te Tai Tokerau in the 2014 election. Davis was elected as Labour Deputy Leader two months before the 2017 election, becoming the first deputy of Māori descent in the Labour Party. Currently, the third-ranked member of the Sixth Labour Government, Davis serves as the Minister of Corrections, Minister for Children, Minister for Māori Crown Relations, and Associate Minister of Education (Māori Education).

Early life
Born in Kawakawa on 2 March 1967, and raised in the Bay of Islands, Davis affiliates to the Ngāpuhi iwi. He received his secondary education at the Bay of Islands College in Kawakawa from 1980 to 1984. He obtained a Diploma of Teaching from Auckland College of Education (1985–1987) and taught at Koru School in Mangere (1988–1990) and Bay of Islands Intermediate School in Kawakawa (1991–1993), before becoming principal of Karetu School near Kawakawa (1994–1998). He then worked for the Education Advisory Service (1998–1999) and the education improvement and development project Te Putahitanga Matauranga (2000). He was principal of Kaitaia Intermediate School from 2001 to 2007.

Member of Parliament

First term, 2008–2011

In the 2008 general election Davis stood for the Labour Party in the Te Tai Tokerau seat after being recruited by Labour MP Shane Jones. Davis failed to unseat the incumbent Hone Harawira of the Māori Party, but was elected to the 49th New Zealand Parliament by way of the party list. The Fifth Labour Government was defeated in the election and, in his first term, Davis was assigned opposition portfolios as the Labour spokesperson for biosecurity and associate spokesperson for education, Māori affairs and tourism. He was a member of the Māori affairs committee.

Harawira left the Māori Party in early 2011, formed the Mana Party and resigned from parliament to seek a fresh mandate in a by-election for Te Tai Tokerau. Davis ran for Labour, but Harawira retook the seat. Davis stood for the seat in the November 2011 general election, but placed second to Harawira for a third time and also failed to re-enter parliament from the party list. Davis announced his retirement from politics and took up a job with the Ministry of Education in Kaitaia, working in Māori education.

Return to Parliament, 2014 
Davis was re-selected as Labour's candidate in Te Tai Tokerau for the September 2014 general election. Shane Jones then resigned from Parliament months prior to the election, and Davis assumed his place in the House of Representatives on 23 May 2014, as he was by then the highest-ranking non-MP on Labour's 2011 party list. He became Labour's associate spokesperson for corrections.

Second term, 2014–2017
Harawira's party formed a coalition with the Kim Dotcom-founded Internet Party for the 2014 election. This resulted in Davis getting endorsements from Winston Peters of New Zealand First party and the Prime Minister, John Key of the National Party. Even the candidate for the Māori Party, Te Hira Paenga, reminded voters of the importance of strategic voting. Davis won the seat, ousting Harawira and ending the representation of the Mana Party in Parliament.

Davis became Labour's corrections spokesperson. In 2015, he criticised private prison provider Serco's management of inmates, alleging 'corruption' at the Mount Eden remand facility. Following an inquiry, Serco lost its contract to run the facility and Minister of Corrections Sam Lotu-Iiga was relieved of his post. Davis also criticized the Australian government for its incarceration of New Zealand expatriates facing deportation. Davis has also drawn attention to the disproportionately high number of Māori in the New Zealand prison system, with Māori comprising 50.9% of the prison population despite making up just 15% of New Zealand's population.

On 1 August 2017, Davis was appointed Deputy Leader of the Labour Party, serving under Jacinda Ardern. On 1 September 2017, Ardern corrected Davis after he publicly said that Labour would campaign on a capital gains tax policy during the 2020 general election rather than implementing it mid-term. On 19 September, Davis indicated that he was willing to sacrifice his position as Deputy Prime Minister in order for Labour to form a coalition government with either New Zealand First or the Green Party.

Third term, 2017–2020

In the 2017 general election, Davis was re-elected in Te Tai Tokerau, defeating Mana Movement leader Harawira by 4,807 votes. He was appointed Minister for Māori Crown Relations, Minister of Corrections, Minister of Tourism, and Associate Minister of Education in the Sixth Labour Government. As Minister of Corrections, Davis has stressed the need to address the high rates of incarceration of Māori people. In August 2018, he called for a change to "a level of imprisonment that is simply devastating our Māori whānau and communities".

Fourth term, 2020–present
In the 2020 general election, Davis was re-elected in Te Tai Tokerau by a margin of 8,164 votes, defeating the Māori Party's candidate Mariameno Kapa-Kingi.  On the night of Labour's election victory, Davis attracted online criticism after he delivered a victory speech mocking National Party leader Judith Collins, with critics describing it as "despicable", "ungracious" and "disgusting".

On 2 November 2020, Davis was allocated third place in Prime Minister Ardern's Cabinet, retaining his portfolios as Minister for Māori Crown Relations and Minister of Corrections, while picking up those of Minister for Children and Association Minister of Education with responsibility for Māori Education. That same day, Davis indicated that he would not be seeking the role of Deputy Prime Minister, a position usually held by the deputy leader of the senior coalition party or the leader of a coalition partner. Winston Peters, the leader of New Zealand First, had served as Deputy Prime Minister during the first term of the Sixth Labour Government but had lost his seat in the 2020 election.

During the Waikeria Prison riots that occurred between 29 December 2020 and 3 January 2021, Davis declined to issue public statements on the grounds that doing so would encourage other prisoners to take similar action and that he wanted to leave the response to experts. The Corrections Minister's silence during the five-day standoff drew criticism from the National Party's Corrections spokesperson Simeon Brown and Māori Party co-leader Rawiri Waititi, with the former criticising Davis' alleged lack of leadership and the latter saying that the prisoners were protesting their right to basic needs such as clean water, insufficient clothing, and washing facilities. Following the prisoners' negotiated surrender on 3 January, Davis disputed the prisoners' claims that the unrest had been sparked by inhumane and unhygienic conditions at the prison. He also said that "[the men] damaged property worth hundreds of thousands of dollars, and they put their own lives and the health and safety of staff and other prisoners at risk."

In September 2022, Davis in his capacity as Minister of Oranga Tamariki (the Ministry of Children) made remarks during a Parliamentary debate telling the ACT Party's children spokesperson Karen Chhour to "enter the Māori world" and stop looking at the world through a "vanilla lens." Chhour had questioned Davis about the relationship between Oranga Tamariki and the Māori group Te Whānau o Waipareira Trust, which was being investigated for financing Māori Party candidate John Tamihere's campaign during the 2020 election. Davis' remarks had offended Chhour, who is Māori from the Ngāpuhi iwi, who stated that Davis' remarks had taken away her mana (prestige). Davis' remarks were condemned as racist by ACT leader David Seymour, and ACT urged Ardern to order Davis to apologise and to suspend him. Davis initially defended his remarks, but subsequently phoned Chhour and apologised to her.

Notes

References

External links

 
 Kelvin Davis on the Labour Party website

Living people
New Zealand Labour Party MPs
New Zealand list MPs
Unsuccessful candidates in the 2011 New Zealand general election
Members of the New Zealand House of Representatives
New Zealand MPs for Māori electorates
People educated at Bay of Islands College
21st-century New Zealand politicians
Candidates in the 2017 New Zealand general election
1967 births
People from Kawakawa, New Zealand
Members of the Cabinet of New Zealand
Ngāpuhi people
Candidates in the 2020 New Zealand general election